This is a list of battalions of the Devonshire Regiment, which existed as an infantry regiment of the British Army from 1881 to 1958.

Original composition
When the 11th (North Devonshire) Regiment of Foot became the Devonshire Regiment in 1881 under the Cardwell-Childers reforms of the British Armed Forces, seven pre-existent militia and volunteer battalions of Devonshire were integrated into the structure of the regiment. Volunteer battalions had been created in reaction to a perceived threat of invasion by France in the late 1850s. Organised as "rifle volunteer corps", they were independent of the British Army and composed primarily of the middle class.

Reorganisation
The Territorial Force (later Territorial Army) was formed in 1908, which the volunteer battalions joined, while the militia battalions transferred to the "Special Reserve". All volunteer battalions were renumbered to create a single sequential order. Also in 1908, the 3rd (Militia) Battalion was one of the 23 infantry militia battalions to disband, and so the 4th was renumbered at the 3rd.

First World War
The Devons fielded 28 battalions and lost over 6,000 officers and other ranks during the course of the war. The regiment's territorial components formed duplicate second and third line battalions. As an example, the three-line battalions of the 4th Devons were numbered as the 1/4th, 2/4th, and 3/4th respectively, with the third line battalions, being redesignated reserve battalions in 1916. Four battalions of the regiment were formed as part of Secretary of State for War Lord Kitchener's appeal for an initial 100,000 men volunteers in 1914. They were referred to as the New Army or Kitchener's Army. The Volunteer Training Corps were raised with overage or reserved occupation men early in the war, and were initially self-organised into many small corps, with a wide variety of names, such as the Bideford and District Emergence League formed in early August 1914 with 80 members. Recognition of the corps by the authorities brought regulation and as the war continued the small corps were formed into battalion sized units of the county Volunteer Regiment. In 1918 these were linked to county regiments.

Inter-War
By 1920, all of the regiment's war-raised battalions had disbanded. The Special Reserve reverted to its militia designation in 1921, then to the Supplementary Reserve in 1924; however, its battalions were effectively placed in 'suspended animation'. As World War II approached, the Territorial Army was reorganised in the mid-1930s, many of its infantry battalions were converted to other roles, especially anti-aircraft.

Second World War
The regiment's expansion during the Second World War was modest compared to 1914–1918. National Defence Companies were combined to create a new "Home Defence" battalion, and in addition to this 25 battalions of the Home Guard were affiliated to the regiment, wearing its cap badge. By 1944 two anti-aircraft rocket batteries (Z Battery) were also part of the regiment. Due to the daytime (or shift working) occupations of these men, the batteries required eight times the manpower of an equivalent regular battery. A number of Light Anti-Aircraft (LAA) troops were formed from the local battalions to defend specific points, such as factories.
.

Post-World War II
In the immediate post-war period, the army was significantly reduced: nearly all infantry regiments had their first and second battalions amalgamated and the Supplementary Reserve disbanded.

1957 Defence White Paper
Under the 1957 Defence White Paper, it was announced that the Devonshire Regiment would amalgamate with the Dorset Regiment, to form the Devonshire and Dorset Regiment, in May 1958.

References

Bibliography
 H. G. Parkyn, Journal of the Society for Army Historical Research, Vol. 15, No. 60 (Winter, 1936), Society for Army Historical Research, 1936
 Ray Westlake. Tracing the Rifle Volunteers: A Guide for Military and Family Historians, Casemate Publishers, 2010

Devonshire Regiment
Devonshire Regiment, List of battalions
Devonshire Regiment
Battalions